This is a list of the first minority male lawyer(s) and judge(s) in Pennsylvania. It includes the year in which the men were admitted to practice law (in parentheses). Also included are other distinctions such as the first minority men in their state to graduate from law school or become a political figure.

Firsts in Pennsylvania's history

Lawyers 

 First Jewish American male: Moses Levy (1778) 
First African American male: Jonathan Jasper Wright (1865) 
First Native American (Sioux) male: Hastings M. Robertson (1907)  
First blind male: Leonard Staisey (c. 1950)  
 First Hispanic American male: Juan Silva (1965)
First Latino American male prosecutor: Carlos Vega

State judges 

 First Jewish American male: Issac Miranda in 1727 
 First Jewish American male (Supreme Court of Pennsylvania): Horace Stern in 1936 
 First African American male: Herbert E. Millen (c. 1910) in 1947 
 First Italian American male (Supreme Court of Pennsylvania): Michael Musmanno in 1951  
 First African American male (common pleas): Raymond Pace Alexander (1923) in 1959  
First African American male (superior court): Theodore O. Spaulding in 1966  
First African American male (Supreme Court of Pennsylvania): Robert N. C. Nix Jr. (c. 1954) in 1972 
First Asian American male: William M. Marutani in 1975 
First Cuban American male: Eduardo C. Robreno (1978) 
First blind male: Leonard Staisey (c. 1950) from 1979-1990 
First Hispanic American male: Nelson A. Diaz (1972) in 1981 
First African American male(Chief Justice; Supreme Court of Pennsylvania): Robert N. C. Nix Jr. (c. 1954) in 1984 
First openly gay male: Daniel Anders in 2007
First openly gay male of color: Greg Yorgey-Girdy in 2022

Federal judges 
First African American male (United States District Court for the Eastern District of Pennsylvania): A. Leon Higginbotham Jr. (1952) in 1964 
First African American male (United States District Court of the Western District of Pennsylvania): Paul Allen Simmons (1949) in 1978 
First Cuban American male (United States District Court for the Eastern District of Pennsylvania): Eduardo C. Robreno (1978) in 1992 
First African American male (Chief Judge; United States District Court for the Western District of Pennsylvania): Gary L. Lancaster (1974) in 2009  
First Hispanic American male (U.S. Court of Appeals for the Third Circuit): Luis Felipe Restrepo (1986) in 2016 
First Latino American male (Chief Judge; United States District Court for the Eastern District of Pennsylvania): Juan Ramon Sanchez (1981) in 2018

District Attorney 

 First African American male: R. Seth Williams in 2010

Political Office 

 Daniel Anders: First openly LGBT male (a lawyer) to run for public office and win a judicial seat in Pennsylvania (2007)
Brian Sims (2004): First openly LGBT male (a lawyer) elected as a state legislator in Pennsylvania (2012)

Pennsylvania Bar Association 

 First Jewish male president: Gilbert "Ott" Nurick in 1967
 First Puerto Rican male admitted: Nelson A. Diaz (1972) 
First African American male president: Michael H. Reed from 2004-2005

Firsts in local history 

 Homer S. Brown: First African American male judge in Allegheny County, Pennsylvania
 Leonard Staisey (c. 1950): First blind male lawyer and judge (1979-1990) in Allegheny County, Pennsylvania
 George E. James: First African American male judge in Beaver County, Pennsylvania (1998)
 Angelo A. Santella (1928): First Italian American male lawyer in Altoona, Blair County, Pennsylvania
 Clyde W. Waite: First African American male judge in Bucks County, Pennsylvania
 J. Curtis Joyner (1974): First African American judge in Chester County, Pennsylvania. He would later become a district court judge.
 Juan Ramon Sanchez (1981): First Latino American male admitted to the Chester County Bar Association
 William H. Ridley: First African American male lawyer in Delaware County, Pennsylvania
 Mark C. Alexander: First African American male to serve as the Dean of Villanova University School of Law (2016)
 Alfred Hemmons: First African American male lawyer admitted to the Lehigh County Bar Association (1975)
 Maxwell H. Cohen: First Jewish male lawyer admitted to the Monroe County Bar Association in Pennsylvania. He was also the first lawyer to hire an African American law clerk and a female law clerk.
 Horace A. Davenport: First African American male judge in Montgomery County, Pennsylvania (1975)
 Daniel J. Clifford: First openly LGBT male judge in Montgomery County, Pennsylvania (2016)
 Mark C. Alexander: First African American male to serve as the Dean of Villanova University School of Law (2016)
 Aaron Albert Mossell (1888): First African American male to graduate from the University of Pennsylvania Law School [Philadelphia County, Pennsylvania]
 Aladino A. Autillo: First male lawyer of Italian descent in Philadelphia, Philadelphia County, Pennsylvania
 Eugene Alessandroni: First Italian American male judge in Philadelphia, Philadelphia County, Pennsylvania
 Greg Yorgey-Girdy: First openly gay male of color to serve as a Municipal Court Judge in the First Judicial District in Philadelphia (2022)
 Bernard G. Segal: First Jewish male lawyer to serve as the Chancellor of the Philadelphia Bar Association (c. 1950s) [Philadelphia County, Pennsylvania]
 Carl E. Singley: First African American male to serve as the Dean of Temple University Beasley School of Law (1983)
 Chuck Patterson: First African American male judge in York County, Pennsylvania

See also 

 List of first minority male lawyers and judges in the United States

Other topics of interest 

 List of first women lawyers and judges in the United States
 List of first women lawyers and judges in Pennsylvania

References 

 
Minority, Pennsylvania, first
Minority, Pennsylvania, first
Legal history of Pennsylvania
Lists of people from Pennsylvania
Pennsylvania lawyers